"Mary in the Morning" is a song written by American songwriter and record producer Michael Rashkow and singer Johnny Cymbal.

Background
It describes a man's intense love for his wife and how he looks forward to a lifetime with her.

Recordings
"Mary in the Morning" was recorded by a number of artists:
 Al Martino had the most successful recording of the song, reaching number one on the Easy Listening chart for two weeks in July 1967 and number twenty-seven on the Billboard Hot 100, and number thirty-five on the Canadian RPM pop charts.
 Tommy Hunter reached the top of the Canadian  RPM country charts with his version, which also charted on the lower end of the U.S. country charts.
 Glen Campbell recorded the song for his sixth album  Gentle On My Mind, released in 1967.
 Elvis Presley performed the song in his live act at times during the 1970s. He recorded a version that appears on the soundtrack album for the 1970 film, "That's The Way It Is" [Label: RCA Victor – LSP-4445].

See also
 List of number-one adult contemporary singles of 1967 (U.S.)

References

1967 songs
1967 singles
Al Martino songs
Elvis Presley songs
Glen Campbell songs
Tommy Hunter songs